Eschenlohe is a German municipality in the district of Garmisch-Partenkirchen, in Bavaria, on the Loisach River.

Transport
The district has a railway station, on the Munich–Garmisch-Partenkirchen railway.

References

Garmisch-Partenkirchen (district)